The Bark at the Moon Tour was a tour by Ozzy Osbourne from 1983 to 1985, supporting his album Bark at the Moon.

Background
Mötley Crüe and Waysted were support acts for the tour. Osbourne witnessed Mötley Crüe perform at the US Festival in May 1983 and chose them as his opening act for his upcoming world tour. Osbourne has been credited for the fame and success Mötley Crüe received going forward in their careers, and also the popularity of their hedonistic lifestyle.

Personnel
Europe
Ozzy Osbourne – Vocals
Jake E. Lee – Guitar
Bob Daisley – Bass
Carmine Appice – Drums
Don Airey – Keyboards

Bark at the Moon
Ozzy Osbourne – Vocals
Jake E. Lee – Guitar
Bob Daisley – Bass
Tommy Aldridge – Drums
Don Airey – Keyboards

Set lists

Songs played overall
"O Fortuna" (Carl Orff song) [Introduction]
"I Don't Know"
"Mr Crowley"
"Over the Mountain"
"Rock 'N' Roll Rebel"
"Bark at the Moon"
"Revelation Mother Earth"
"Steal Away the Night"
"So Tired"
"Suicide Solution" [and Jake E. Lee guitar solo]
"Centre of Eternity"
Carmine Appice/Tommy Aldridge drum solo
"Flying High Again"
"Iron Man" (Black Sabbath cover) and "Crazy Train"
Encore
"Paranoid" (Black Sabbath cover)
"Goodbye to Romance"

Typical setlist
"O Fortuna" (Carl Orff song) [Introduction]
"I Don't Know"
"Mr Crowley"
"Rock 'N' Roll Rebel"
"Bark at the Moon"
"Revelation Mother Earth"
"Steal Away the Night"
"Suicide Solution" [and Jake E. Lee guitar solo]
"Centre of Eternity"
Carmine Appice/Tommy Aldridge drum solo
"Flying High Again"
"Iron Man" (Black Sabbath cover) and "Crazy Train"
Encore
"Paranoid" (Black Sabbath cover)

Tour dates

References

Ozzy Osbourne concert tours
1983 concert tours
1984 concert tours
1985 concert tours